Players and pairs who neither have high enough rankings nor receive wild cards may participate in a qualifying tournament held one week before the annual Wimbledon Tennis Championships.

Seeds

  Scott Lipsky /  David Martin (qualified)
  Harel Levy /  Rajeev Ram (qualified)
  Rik de Voest /  Nathan Healey (first round)
  Lars Burgsmüller /  Orest Tereshchuk (qualifying competition, lucky losers)
  Sanchai Ratiwatana /  Sonchat Ratiwatana (qualifying competition, lucky losers)
  Rohan Bopanna /  Lovro Zovko (first round)
  Brian Dabul /  Jean-Julien Rojer (first round)
  Alex Kuznetsov /  Mischa Zverev (qualified)

Qualifiers

  Scott Lipsky /  David Martin
  Harel Levy /  Rajeev Ram
  Ilija Bozoljac /  Dick Norman
  Alex Kuznetsov /  Mischa Zverev

Lucky losers

  Lars Burgsmüller /  Orest Tereshchuk
  Sanchai Ratiwatana /  Sonchat Ratiwatana
  Kevin Kim /  Robert Smeets

Qualifying draw

First qualifier

Second qualifier

Third qualifier

Fourth qualifier

External links

2007 Wimbledon Championships – Men's draws and results at the International Tennis Federation
Official Results Archive (ATP)

Men's Doubles Qualifying
Wimbledon Championship by year – Men's doubles qualifying